Ellis Burks Field is a baseball venue located in Ranger, Texas, and the home of the Ranger College Rangers baseball team. The facility was named after former MLB outfielder Ellis Burks who helped with the funding of the construction of the ballpark. The field is located in the southern section of the Ranger College campus.

References

Baseball venues in Texas
1999 establishments in Texas